Ben Faccini is an English novelist, writer and translator.

Origins and upbringing
The son of an Italian father and English mother, Faccini grew up in rural France, but was educated in England. He is the brother of the singer, songwriter and painter, Piers Faccini.

Works
Having worked for many years at UNESCO in Paris (helping between 2008 and 2010 to run its My Life is a Story campaign, to raise awareness about street children), Faccini has written extensively about educational innovations in the developing world.

His first novel, The Water-Breather, was published by Flamingo in 2002. The Guardian's review described it as "an assured and moving debut".

The Guardian's review of Faccini's second novel, The Incomplete Husband (published by Portobello Books in 2007) commented that "Faccini's elegantly crafted prose is often poetic and carries complex emotions".

Faccini has also edited with an introduction a collection of stories by six Italian authors: Outsiders (Quercus, 2013).

His translation into English of Lydie Salvayre's Pas pleurer (as Cry, Mother Spain) was published by MacLehose Press in 2016.

His translation into English of Mahi Binebine's Le Fou du Roi (as The King's Fool) was published by MacLehose Press in 2020.

Faccini has acted as a tutor at the Arvon Foundation.

Personal life
Faccini is married to the artist and illustrator, Emily Faccini. They have three children and live in London and France.

References

 

21st-century English novelists
French–English translators
21st-century translators